Akbar agha Sheykhulislamov (1891 – 1961) was an Azerbaijani public figure and politician. He served in the First cabinet of Azerbaijan Democratic Republic as its Minister of Agriculture and Labor.

Early life and career

Sheykhulislamov was born in Yerevan in 1891. Having graduated from a gymnasium in Erivan, he got enrolled Petersburg State Transport University in 1912. Upon his return to Azerbaijan, he worked as the Deputy Minister of Internal Affairs of Transcaucasian Democratic Federative Republic. Sheykhulislamov was a member of Hummet party. He was one of the co-signers of Proclamation of Independence of Azerbaijan Democratic Republic.

After establishment of Azerbaijan Democratic Republic on May 28, 1918, he was appointed Minister of Agriculture and Labor in Fatali Khan Khoyski's newly formed government and served in the National Assembly of Azerbaijan until the Bolshevik invasion of Azerbaijan on April 28, 1920, when he fled the country.

Sheykhulislamov died on March 2, 1961, in Paris, France and was buried in Bobigny Islamic cemetery (near Paris).

See also
Azerbaijani National Council

References

Armenian Azerbaijanis
1891 births
1961 deaths
Azerbaijan Democratic Republic politicians
Government ministers of Azerbaijan
Politicians from Yerevan
French people of Azerbaijani descent
Azerbaijani nobility